Platinum Arts Sandbox is a world and video-game creation tool. The software contains single-player and multiplayer in-game level editors. The game engine is a free and open-source software. It was first released on June 4, 2007.

Features 

The software has multiple features.

Single-player modes 

 Basic editing
 Role Playing Game (RPG)
 Side-scrolling platformer
 Movie Cube (Machinima) (SVN development version only)

Multiplayer functionality is possible with LAN or via the Internet. This mode gets its server listings from a master server. Included multiplayer modes are cooperative editing, Banana Relay, a base capturing mode, and free run, a mode where editing is not allowed.

The main scripting language of Sandbox is Lua.

Features in media 
 PBS/WMHT Games in Education Conference 
 Moddb.com Top 100 Mod/Game of the Year 2008 
 Many various Moddb.com Interviews and Features 
 Slashdot.org Article - Involving Kids In Free Software Through Games?
 Total PC Gaming Magazine, February 2009
 Podcast interview with Michael Tomaino
 PC Format Magazine Issue 232 November 2009

References

External links 
 Official Platinum Arts Sandbox Game Maker Webpage
 Official Forums
 Official Wiki
 Official Platinum Arts Webpage

Video game development software